Obie Bermúdez (born January 10, 1981) is a Puerto Rican Latin pop, salsa singer and composer.

Early years
Bermúdez was born in Aibonito, Puerto Rico into a family who loved music. His father and grandfather were both musicians.  He received his primary education in the town of Aibonito. In 1992, the family moved to Vineland, New Jersey where he received his secondary education at Vineland High School, graduating in 1995. Bermúdez is bilingual and speaks English and Spanish fluently.

Bermúdez followed the family legacy to love and respect music. This love and respect was what empowered Bermúdez with the drive to pursue his dream, even when the circumstances were less than favorable.  In 1996, he recorded his first "demo".

Career as a singer
In 1998, Bermúdez recorded his first CD and debuted as a professional singer with Locales (Locals).  Locales was recorded by BMG Records.  His music recordings contained more musical instruments than your typical salsa orquestra and his songs contain a social message.

In 2000, Bermúdez moved to New York City, believing that there he would be able to obtain the success that he wanted, however that did not occur and he ended up working in a laundromat to sustain himself economically.  While working at the laundromat, he came into contact with all sorts of people from different levels of society.  The experiences that he gained by observing and coming into contact with these people would serve him in the near future with his song writing.

In 2003, he was contracted to participate in the United States musical tours of Juanes, Paulina Rubio and Juan Luis Guerra.  In 2004, Bermúdez released his second CD Confesiones.  This CD contained three songs which reached the Top 10 singles on Billboard's Hot Latin Charts.

In January 2005 he released Todo el Año (All year long) which included the songs Maldita Boca (Damn mouth) and Ya te Olvide (I have forgotten you), he also released Como Pudiste (How could you?).

In his production Todo el Año, Bermúdez express' that he is closer than ever to the emotions of the common men and that he continues to stay connected to the everyday people who walk the streets.  In his style he express' a handful of experiences of the past year.  Todo el Año covers many personal themes including love.  As the singer explained: "The opportunity to present this Album is more than a blessing.  I'm happy that the public has embraced me and feel so fortunate... I hope that Todo el Año will be another album that my fans can relate to." The album won a Latin Grammy for Best Male Pop Vocal Album in 2005.

In 2006, Bermúdez began working towards his theatrical debut in the production of El Canto del Coquí, which was staged in 2007. He also revealed in an interview conducted by "People en Español" in its January 2006 issue, that he may participate in a movie production, however he failed to mention the title of the film.

Later years
Bermúdez returned with the August 29, 2006, release of his fourth album, "Lo Que Trajo El Barco" (What The Ship Has Brought In). The album represents the eagerly awaited follow-up to Bermúdez’ Latin GRAMMY winning album Todo El Año. In 2009, Bermúdez together with Danny Rivera, Ray de la Paz, Claudette Sierra and Frankie Negrón, participated in the recording of Songs of the Capeman, based on Paul Simons play The Capeman (a Broadway musical about the life of Salvador Agron) under the direction of Oscar Hernández and his Spanish Harlem Orquestra.

He became engaged to Latin Popstar Jennifer Peña, they married on June 3, 2007, in a private ceremony in Corpus Christi, Texas. They have two children, Jobien and Jonie Bermúdez.

Discography

Albums
 Locales (1998)
 Confesiones (2003)
 Todo el Año (2004)
 Lo Que Trajo el Barco (2006)
 Sólo Éxitos (2007)
 Quién Me Lo Va a Creer (2012)
 #Cambios (2016)

Singles
Antes 
Maldita Boca
Ya te olvide
Como Pudiste 
Si fuera Facil
Todo el año
Puede ser
Preso en mi Propia Piel
4:00 Am
Sigo con ella

See also

List of Puerto Ricans

References

External links
Official Website
 Obie Bermúdez debutara en cine
Obie Bermudez Interview – NAMM Oral History Library (2016)

1981 births
Living people
People from Aibonito, Puerto Rico
People from Vineland, New Jersey
21st-century Puerto Rican male singers
Puerto Rican male composers
Salsa musicians
Latin Grammy Award winners
Puerto Rican pop singers
Latin pop singers
EMI Latin artists
Latin music songwriters
Vineland High School alumni